Aristophanes (c. 456 – c. 386 BC) is Greek Old Comic dramatist known for his plays The Frogs, The Birds, The Clouds, and Lysistrata.

Aristophanes may also refer to:
2934 Aristophanes, a small main belt asteroid named after the above
Aristophanes (vase painter) (fl. 5th century BC), ancient Greek vase painter of the Attic red-figure style
Aristophanes of Byzantium (c. 257 – c. 185 BC), Greek scholar, critic and grammarian

See also
Aristophane (1967–2004), Guadalopean comics artist
Aris (disambiguation)

Greek masculine given names